Mogens Dahl Concert Hall is a chamber music venue in the Islands Brygge district of Copenhagen, Denmark. It was opened at the private initiative of Mogens Dahl in 2005.

Building
The concert hall is located in the former Hertz Book Publishing House from 1901. The complex also houses the design company VIPP.

Use
The concert hall plays host to Chamber concerts with both Danish and international names. It also has its own chamber ensemble, Mogens Dahl Chamber Choir.

Among the musicians to have played in the hall are:
 Leif Ove Andsnes, piano
 Tokyo String Quartet
 Bo Skovhus, barytone
 Juilliard String Quartet
 Angela Hewitt, piano
 Trio Wanderer
 Trio con Brio Copenhagen

The hall is named after its founder and owner, conductor Mogens Dahl.

References

External links 
 Mogens Dahl Concert Hall website
 Hertz Bogtrykkergård

Concert halls in Copenhagen
Music venues completed in 2005
Convention centres in Denmark